Sweeter Than the Day is an album by American keyboardist and composer Wayne Horvitz recorded in 2001 and released on the Canadian Songlines label.

Reception
The Allmusic review by David R. Adler awarded the album 4 stars stating "Above all, it's a fantastic-sounding record... The music is laid-back and a bit melancholy, with a layered folk-rock eclecticism... both tuneful and highly angular in the same breath".

Track listing
All compositions by Wayne Horvitz except as indicated
 "In One Time and Another" - 4:48 
 "Julian's Ballad" - 6:11 
 "LTMBBQ" - 6:18 
 "Sweeter Than the Day" - 5:05 
 "Irondbound" - 6:29 
 "Waltz From the Oven" - 5:47 
 "In the Lounge" - 5:30 
 "The Beautiful Number 3" (Timothy Young) - 5:44 
 "The Little Parade" - 6:52 
 "George's Solo" - 4:23 
Recorded at Studio Litho in Seattle, Washington in January 2001

Personnel
Wayne Horvitz - piano, prepared piano
Timothy Young - 6 and 12 string electric guitars
Keith Lowe - bass
Andy Roth - drums

References

Wayne Horvitz albums
2001 albums